Flight 238 may refer to:

Royal Brunei Airlines Flight 238, crashed on 6 September 1997
Aerocon Flight 238, crashed on 6 September 2011

0238